Penumarru is a village in Guntur district of the Indian state of Andhra Pradesh. It is the located in Vemuru mandal of Tenali revenue division.

Geography 

Government and politics 

Penumarru gram panchayat is the local self-government of the village. It is divided into wards and each ward is represented by a ward member.

Transport 

Penumarru railway station provides the village with rail connectivity.

Education 

As per the school information report for the academic year 2018–19, the village has only two Mandal Parishad.

See also 
List of villages in Guntur district

References 

Villages in Guntur district